Samuel Alejandro Sosa Cordero (born 17 December 1999) is a Venezuelan footballer who plays as a winger for Academia Puerto Cabello on loan from Argentine club Talleres.

Club career
Sosa represented Deportivo Táchira and Talleres de Córdoba. On 29 July 2019, he moved to Europe and joined Spanish Segunda División side AD Alcorcón on loan for one year. On 27 August of the following year, his loan was extended for a further season.

International career
Sosa was called up to the Venezuela under-20 side for the 2017 FIFA U-20 World Cup. He scored the seventh goal in his side's 7–0 victory over Vanuatu.

Sosa took part in his side's run to the final, particularly scoring an injury-time equalizer against Uruguay through a spectacular free-kick as his side beat their fellow South American rivals on penalties to advance to the final, with Sosa scoring his attempt.

He made his Venezuela national football team debut on 1 June 2019, in a friendly against Ecuador, as a half-time substitute for Adalberto Peñaranda.

Career statistics

Club

International

Honours

International
Venezuela
FIFA U-20 World Cup: Runner-up 2017

References

External links

1999 births
Living people
People from Valencia, Venezuela
Venezuelan footballers
Association football wingers
Venezuelan Primera División players
Deportivo Táchira F.C. players
Argentine Primera División players
Talleres de Córdoba footballers
Segunda División players
AD Alcorcón footballers
Venezuela under-20 international footballers
Venezuela international footballers
Venezuelan expatriate footballers
Venezuelan expatriate sportspeople in Argentina
Venezuelan expatriate sportspeople in Spain
Expatriate footballers in Argentina
Expatriate footballers in Spain